Devlab may refer to:
 DevLab (research alliance), Development Laboratories, a Research Alliance in the Netherlands
 Devlab (album) (2004), the seventh solo album by Canadian musician Devin Townsend